Lefter Talo is a village in the former commune of Livadhe, Vlorë County, southern Albania. At the 2015 local government reform it became a subdivision of the municipality of Finiq. At 1993 the total population of the village was 178, all of them part of the Greek community in Albania.

Name
The name Lefter Talo (Lefteris Talios in Greek) was given to the village by the authorities of the People's Republic of Albania to honor a local Greek resistance leader (Hero of the People recipient). The former name of the village was Hajdëragas and was of Albanian origin with its suffix (-aga) coming from the Turkish title agha. At the Ottoman registers of 1895 it was recorded as Hadir-aga or Haidar-aga. It derived from the name of an Ottoman-era landowner who was in possession of the settlement.

References

Administrative units of Finiq
Former municipalities in Vlorë County
Villages in Vlorë County